Egor Nikolayevich Feoktistov (born 22 June 1993) is a Russian volleyball player for Ural Ufa and the Russian national team.

He participated at the 2017 Men's European Volleyball Championship.

References

1993 births
Living people
Russian men's volleyball players
Ural Ufa volleyball players
Universiade medalists in volleyball
Universiade gold medalists for Russia
Medalists at the 2015 Summer Universiade
Sportspeople from Bashkortostan
20th-century Russian people
21st-century Russian people